Brahmagiri is a town in Puri district, Odisha, India.The Vishnu Mandira. (Long years back (in 1610 A.D) Lord ChaitanyaMahaprabhu stayed at Alarnath during anavasara period of Lord Jagannath . Anavasara is the two weeks period when Lord Jagannatha take rest in isolation from the rest of the world after suffering from fever due to the annual bathing festival (SnanaYatra). Lord Chaitanya claimed that he visualised the appearance of Lord Jagannath in Alarnath and spent a long period in worshipping the deity here. It is believed that those who cannot worship Lord Jagannath during his stay in the sick chamber can get the blessings of the deity if they visit the Alarnath temple. During this period the temple servitors offered holy porridge (rice pudding sweetened by jaggery), known as ‘Kheer’ in local language, to the lord. During anavasara period of every year thousands of devotees visit Alarnath temple to get the blessings of Lord Alarnath and to taste a pot of famous holy ‘Kheer’)

Geography

Location
Brahmagiri is 20 km from Puri. National Highway 203A passes through Brahmagiri.

Tourism
The famous Alarnath Temple is at Brahmagiri. Hundreds of pilgrims visit the shrine here during the anabasara of Lord Jagannath. Baliharachandi, a sacred place and tourist spot, is around 10 km south. It is on sand dunes.

Nearest airport is Biju Patnaik International Airport at Bhubaneswar and the nearest railway station is at Puri and Sakhi Gopal is a near by train station as well.

References

External links
 About Brahmagiri
 Satellite map of Brahmagiri

Cities and towns in Puri district